Dr. Moira MacTaggert (sometimes spelled MacTaggart, McTaggart, McTaggert) , more recently known as Moira X, is a fictional character appearing in American comic books published by Marvel Comics. She first appeared in The Uncanny X-Men #96 (Dec. 1975) and was created by writer Chris Claremont and artist Dave Cockrum. She works as a geneticist and is an expert in mutant affairs. She is most commonly in association with the X-Men and has been a member of the Muir Island X-Men team and Excalibur.

For the first 44 years of publication, Moira was traditionally depicted in comic books as a supporting character to the X-Men and a human love interest for central character Professor Xavier. In 2019, as part Marvel's House of X and Powers of X relaunch of X-Men comics by writer Jonathan Hickman, Moira's backstory was fundamentally changed, revealing she had been a mutant all along, with a rare power that let her redo her life every time she died. The story set the stage for a major status quo change for X-Men comics, including the formation of the mutant nation state of Krakoa. Later still, Moira betrays the mutant cause and becomes an antagonist to the X-Men.

Olivia Williams played Dr. Moira MacTaggert in the 2006 feature film X-Men: The Last Stand. In the 2011 feature film X-Men: First Class, Rose Byrne played a younger Moira MacTaggert, but in this film, the character is a CIA officer rather than a geneticist. Byrne returned as MacTaggert in the 2016 feature film X-Men: Apocalypse.

Publication history
Moira MacTaggert was created by Chris Claremont and Dave Cockrum, and first appeared in Uncanny X-Men #96 (December 1975). Moira was one of the major supporting characters in Claremont's Uncanny X-Men run. She worked as a geneticist and was an expert in mutant affairs. She was romantically involved with Professor X. She would eventually found a foundation center on Muir Island centered on mutant research.

Moira MacTaggert received an entry in the Official Handbook of the Marvel Universe Update '89 #4.

Grant Morrison wanted to use Moira on their run on New X-Men as the team scientist, but she was killed prior to the start of the series causing them to use Beast (Henry "Hank" McCoy) instead.

Moira was one of the feature characters in the 2011 two-issue limited series Chaos War: X-Men.

She is one of the main characters in House of X and Powers of X, written by Jonathan Hickman. House of X #2 retconned established continuity, revealing her to be a mutant with the ability to reincarnate within her own timeline; on her death, she is returned to the moment she is conceived with full knowledge of her previous lives. Her knowledge of potential futures, when divulged to Professor X and Magneto, leads to the formation of the nation-state of Krakoa and the new status quo for the X-Men books following House of X and Powers of X.

Fictional character biography

Early years
Born Moira Kinross to Scottish parents, Moira MacTaggert was one of the world's leading authorities on genetic mutation, earning her a Nobel Prize for her work. She was the longest running human associate of the X-Men and was Professor Charles Xavier's colleague, confidante, and also once his fiancée, having met and fallen in love with him while they were postgraduates at Oxford University. She ended their engagement for unknown reasons and returned to Scotland. She was married to her old flame, the late politician Joseph MacTaggert which caused delays with her former engagement to Xavier: Joe had proved to be an abusive husband; Moira separated from him after he beat her into a week long coma and, as it is implied, raped her, leaving her pregnant. She kept her son's existence a secret, and when Joe refused her a divorce, she allowed people to believe she was widowed.

She eventually created a Mutant Research Centre on Muir Island, off the coast of Scotland. Moira was forced to contain and imprison her son Kevin, later called Proteus, when he developed reality warping abilities and severe psychosis. One of Moira's goals was to understand human/mutant genetics, in order to cure her son.

Moira's connection to the X-Men began long before the team formed. The silent partner in the founding of Xavier's School for Gifted Youngsters and co-creator of Cerebro, Moira assisted Xavier in helping the young Jean Grey recover after the traumatic triggering of her mutant abilities.

Moira was a kind woman who took to helping humans and mutants alike. She rescued a young Rahne Sinclair (Wolfsbane) from an angry mob, and adopted the girl. She even attempted to treat Xavier's son, a mutant known as Legion who suffered from dissociative identity disorder. When a confused, traumatized Cable first arrived from the future, he washed up in Scotland unable to speak English, and it was Moira who stood up for him against an angry mob. Taking him back to Muir Island, he scanned her mind and learned English in the process, as well as the truth about her son, and promised to keep her secrets. She taught him literature and the customs of the time and introduced him to Xavier. They became close friends ever since, being the first kind person Cable met in the present timeline, her later death devastating him enough to leave the X-Men. When Magneto was reduced to infancy, he was entrusted to Moira's care on Muir Island, where she altered his genetic code in an attempt to keep him from reverting to villainy.

Involvement with the X-Men
Moira appeared at Xavier's call to act as "housekeeper" for the team while they were on missions (a position that required her to demonstrate her proficiency with an M16 rifle against a demon within hours of her arrival). Though each of the X-Men formed some sort of relationship with the "Widow" MacTaggert, Moira and Sean Cassidy (Banshee) hit it off immediately, forming an on-and-off relationship that would last for the remainder of her life. Proteus' escape and eventual destruction at the hands of Colossus and the X-Men left Moira in a position of ethical compromise again: though Banshee stopped her from cloning her son, she saved his genetic structure on disk to allow herself the future option of bringing him back.

After finding out that her foster daughter, Rahne, was a mutant, Moira was the catalyst for change. She talked a discouraged Xavier into opening his school to the next generation of New Mutants, with Rahne becoming an initial member. She was also an integral part of the support for the X-Men and the New Mutants, providing medical aid including cloning Xavier after the Brood attacks, transferring his mind into a new body and restoring his ability to walk after a Brood embryo nearly killed him.

With the apparent death of the X-Men, Moira and Banshee formed an alternate team based from Muir, and carried on as the leader of the team without him when his duties with the X-Men called him away. Her behavior became unpredictable, her temper impressive, and her decisions harsh and unforgiving as she displayed behavior that made all who knew her suspicious. On Muir, she began to pit her charges against each other in an arena in merciless battles, supposedly allowing her the opportunity to study mutants in action.

Moira and her islanders were involved in the return of Proteus due to the influence of Advanced Idea Mechanics. This was a four-part story in 1991, that ran through that year's annuals for the New Warriors, X-Force, New Mutants and X-Factor. The Shadow King, the corrupting entity behind the island, allowed the Islanders to act heroically in defense of innocent lives.

Eventually, the entire population of Muir Island was identified as being possessed by and mentally corrupted by Shadow King, pitting the Islanders against the combined forces of the X-Men and X-Factor before Xavier freed them from his control.

Moira's alteration of Magneto did not go unnoticed indefinitely. Enraged when he discovered Moira had tampered with his free will, Magneto took Moira captive and forced her to perform the procedure on half of the X-Men, turning them against their teammates. While Moira's alterations worked, it was revealed that, due to mutants' powers requiring their body chemistry to operate in a specific manner, use of a mutant's powers would cause them to automatically resist the 'programming' and reverse the effects of the procedure, so anything Magneto had done was of his own free will. While hostage on Asteroid M, Moira witnessed Fabian Cortez draining Magneto of his powers and manipulating him into placing him as his right hand. Though Cortez fled, it was an observation that would eventually put Moira back in the hands of the Acolytes. Back on Earth, Moira was unable to accept her betrayal of her surrogate family and her own infallibility, and fled the X-Mansion, with Banshee in pursuit.

Excalibur and the Legacy Virus
When a mysterious virus began attacking the genetically engineered mutate population of Genosha, Moira volunteered her services as a geneticist and was forced to watch as the former slaves were decimated by disease. Returning to the X-Mansion, Moira found Illyana Rasputin suffering from the same illness, later identified as the Legacy Virus. Moving back to Muir Island after the girl's death, Moira became the key figure in working for a cure to the disease (during this time, she also worked on curing Wolfsbane's artificial bond with Havok).

The European superhero team Excalibur took up residence on Muir Island after assisting Moira. She had been attacked by agents of Mister Sinister who was seeking the genetic information on her son. Moira became an official member of the group, acting as their medic, team mother, and morale officer. An information leak revealed her to be the only human infected by the Legacy Virus—a bizarre turn of events possibly caused by her long exposure to the infected on Genosha, her autopsy of Illyana, or some susceptibility because she gave birth to a mutant. Despite these events, she maintained a strong outlook on life, helping to maintain discipline, reduce tension, and increase the team's effectiveness throughout Europe. She convinced the team to stay behind when Onslaught emerged, telling them they might be needed if other heroes fell.

Conferring with the X-Men's Beast did not result in appreciable progress. Locking herself in quarantine in a final attempt to cure the virus without endangering any of her teammates, Moira found her attempts foiled by her foster daughter, Wolfsbane, and Douglock. Wolfsbane originally leapt through the closing doors of the laboratory as the quarantine took effect. She soon found herself a willing assistant to her foster mother's work. Douglock later caused much unintentional damage, his judgement clouded by personal feelings for Wolfsbane. Moira takes time off from her research to attend the bachelorette party and the wedding for her friends Meggan and Brian Braddock.

Moira did eventually find a cure for the disease, when the terrorist Mystique manipulated her research to force the virus to target only humans. Mystique, partly assisted by Sabretooth, then destroyed Muir Island, de-powered Wolfsbane with the power nullifier once developed by Forge, and brutally injured Moira. Bishop, Wolverine, and Rogue attempted to save Moira's life. Despite Rogue's powers temporarily granting her medical knowledge, she was unable to do so. Moira clung to life long enough to mentally transfer the information to Xavier in one final embrace between the former lovers. Xavier nearly went with her into death, but Jean Grey and Cable intervened on the astral plane, talking him down. She appeared to have died in the X-Men's jet, far above the Atlantic Ocean, and was later buried in Scotland. A psychic representation of Moira was seen as an active portion of Xavier's consciousness as he worked on rebuilding Genosha though "she" claimed she was just a manifestation of his imaginations.

Moira is next seen in the afterlife, in which she, Mockingbird, Gwen Stacy, and Dead Girl assist Doctor Strange in battling a being known as the Pitiful One. Moira finds herself more interested in the book club she formed with Mockingbird and Gwen Stacy then in battling evil.

X-Men: Deadly Genesis
After the events of M-Day and upon the reawakening of Vulcan, significant portions of Moira's history with Xavier and the original X-Men are called into light. While in the rubble of Muir Island research center, Banshee freaks out when he notices Moira standing outside in the pouring rain, but when he rushes outside she has already disappeared. When she appears to him again, and believing he's really seeing Moira's spirit, Sean decides to follows her to a house where she leads him to an old stockroom. Moira's image then fades away as Sean finds important notes from Xavier which reveals that during the early years of Xavier's Academy, Moira founded and ran a secondary facility not far from the Xavier School, in which she had her own students—youths whom she took out of bad situations and adopted as her wards, training them in their abilities without the highly militant regimen of Charles' X-Men.

When Krakoa captured the original X-Men, it was Moira's students whom Charles went to first—not the second team of Wolverine, Storm, Banshee, Colossus, Nightcrawler, Thunderbird and Sunfire as it was originally believed—putting them through the psionic equivalent of boot camp and allowing them to believe they were being trained over months as X-Men. Charles took them from Moira's care immediately.

Moira's students—Vulcan (Gabriel Summers, the lost brother of X-Men Cyclops and Havok), Petra, Darwin, and Sway—were apparently all killed, and Xavier suppressed even the memory of them from his own students to keep them from going back to save them. Only Moira's project tapes—one made directly after the event before Xavier could suppress the memories—and an abandoned research center remain as clues.

Chaos War
During the "Chaos War" storyline, Moira MacTaggert is brought back from the afterlife, alongside the fallen X-Men members John Proudstar, Banshee, three Madrox dupes, and Sophie and Esme Cuckoo, after what happened to the death realms. After escaping from the Apache god Carrion Crow, the group discovers that Moira has been possessed by Destiny's ghost. She returns to the afterlife after stopping the Carrion Crow from destroying the elemental spirits of life.

House of X 
In 2019's House of X, it is revealed that Moira is actually a mutant with the power of reincarnation, starting her life again in the womb after each death, possessing full memories of her prior lives. She is also revealed to be alive, having replaced herself with a Shi'ar golem that went on to die at the hands of the Brotherhood. It can be assumed that the golem contracted the Legacy Virus, was seen in the afterlife following her death, and brought back to life during the Chaos War. Moira is revealed to be living her tenth life.

The Lives of Moira MacTaggert
Life 1
Moira Kinross was born to powerful Scots nobleman Lord Kinross and when she turned 13, her mutant ability manifested, but due to her passive power, there were no signs indicating that she had become a mutant other than a strong, temporary fever. Living a simple life, Moira meets Charles Xavier, but he passes through without them forming a bond. She later marries a man named Kenneth Cowan and has three children: twin boys Callum and Dean, and a girl named Abigail. Kenneth dies when Moira is 68 years old, and she passes away from congestive heart failure at age 74.

Life 2
Her second life begins in utero, having already become fully sentient and possessing a perfect recollection of her prior life which allowed Moira to appear intellectually gifted, and she was pushed in the direction of academia. She didn't fight her parents' intentions, since she intended to understand her true nature. After she verified that she wasn't suffering from psychosis or a disorder, and having lived through one life with Kenneth and learning all his faults, she makes a point not to fall in love with him when they met. She enrolls at Oxford at age 16, becomes a biology professor at 20, founds the Muir Research Institute at 31, and at 44 she finally deduced she was a mutant after seeing Charles Xavier coming out as one on television. She boards a plane to the United States of America in order to meet him; however, the plane crashes before reaching its destination, killing Moira.

Life 3
Moira made a point of finding Xavier earlier in her third life. She meets Charles Xavier when they were both at Oxford University, and the two of them became the world's foremost experts in genetic mutation. But Moira became displeased by his arrogance and thinly veiled god complex. She also became disgusted by her mutation and began comparing it to cancer, and so, decided to invent a cure. Moira founds the Muir Research Institute, and at 36 she identifies the X-gene and eventually a cure. She intended for it to be voluntarily administered, but the very idea offends the Brotherhood of Mutants. Able to see the future, Destiny alone is able to sense Moira's mutant status and see the effects her reincarnations are having on the timeline. Destiny orders Moira to stop wasting her gift by working against her own kind, and instead help prevent a seemingly inevitable future where humans would always try to exterminate the mutant race. Destiny also tells Moira of her own future, revealing that Moira will ultimately live either 10 or 11 lives, depending on the choices she makes in the 10th cycle. Destiny also reveals that if Moira dies before her powers manifest at the age 13, she won't reincarnate. With that, Destiny warns Moira that she'll continue to hunt her in each new life if she doesn't work for the betterment of mutantkind. To make sure that Moira takes her seriously, she then has Pyro burn her to death, slowly, so she would always remember what this slow and painful death feels like.

Life 4
In her fourth life, reconsidering the positive nature of mutants and Xavier himself, Moira throws herself into studying the human-mutant dilemma. She meets Xavier and goes on to fall in love with and marry him, with the couple establishing the Xavier School for Gifted Children. At first glance, this reality is almost a mirror of the current Marvel Universe with Moira, Xavier, and the X-Men fighting for the mutant cause for years. But ultimately at age 55, Moira realizes Destiny's vision was right after all when the Sentinels attack the School and kills Moira and Charles.

Life 5
Now choosing aggression as a response to the violent tendencies of humanity, Moira runs away from home at 13, to encounter Xavier a full decade earlier than when they're supposed to meet. Not wasting any time, Moira opens her mind to Xavier so he can see how his dream fails in her past lives. The mind-reading radicalizes him, forcing the duo to form the mutant nation of Faraway instead of a school. It seemed mutants were finally safe from humanity. Yet, Bolivar Trask's adaptive-learning Sentinels still make their way there, and Moira is initially injured in an attack when she was 43 and dies a year later during a genocide.

Life 6
In her sixth life Moira discovers the true threat to mutants are neither the machines or humanity but, ironically, time itself. It turns out that while mutants are the natural evolutionary response to humans, they will not be the next evolutionary step for humanity and they never will be, because humanity will render evolution obsolete by using technology to adapt the environment to humanity rather than humanity adapting to its environment. Humans will then use technology to extend their lifespans until they reach an evolutionary stagnation; at that point they will merge with their technology and become a genetically engineered new species. These new Post-Humans (Homo novissima) are human-machine hybrids that will depose both Homo sapiens and Homo superior as the dominant species on Earth. 1000 years in the future, the last surviving mutants are kept captive in preserve areas as a diversionary tactic to keep them from interfering with the process of breeding something far beyond human or mutant. Moira and Wolverine are among them because they were able to survive on each other's blood. One of the Post-Humans, the Librarian, comes to them and reveal how they'll achieve godhood: The Post-Human techno-organic nature allows humanity to be more readily physically absorbed by the Phalanx in a process known as Ascension that will allow them to join the hive mind of the Dominion system to artificially force their evolution into higher beings once again, gaining control over time and space in the process. Aware about Moira's powers, the Librarian intends to send Moira and Wolverine to another planet to prevent Moira from dying and using her knowledge against Homo novissima in her resurrection. Wolverine, however, manages to kill him and, with Moira's consent, her too.

Life 7
With the knowledge that the Trask family is responsible for creating the Sentinels and learning how that technology will be used to overtake mutantkind, Moira spends her seventh life eradicating the Trask bloodline. Bolivar, Donald, Gwyneth, and Simon Trask are systematically murdered over the span of a decade, with Moira even taking out their children for good measure. But when she thought she had successfully eliminated the potential for Sentinel creation, Moira lost all hope when she sadly discovered Sentinels were still being built. With this discovery she finally understood that mutantkind's fall is the "Inevitable Truth:" Artificial Intelligence will always seek to eradicate mutants and its creation cannot be stopped because AI is self-emergent —it is discovered, not created, by humanity. This realization as fully radicalized her as a new breed of Sentinels killed her.

Life 8
Abandoning Xavier's peaceful dream to foster a safe future for mutants Moira seeks out Magneto instead. Presenting Magneto with tales of her past lives and his future failures, Moira convinced him to join her. Together they conquered America, establishing the House of M and initiated the War of M. However, during the war, Moira witnesses Magneto being defeated and killed by the combined might of Earth's humans and mutants—heroes like the Fantastic Four, Avengers, and X-Men. Moira is imprisoned and later killed in a failed prison escape.

Life 9
Though eventually a failure, the life-defining decision Moira made to turn to Magneto did validate her radical approach to beat humanity through force—Magneto was simply not enough. To that end, in her ninth life, Moira woke Apocalypse from his slumber one year after she met Xavier in her current life. Apocalypse then killed Xavier and Magneto and rescued his original Four Horsemen. Forming a powerful union, together, Moira and Apocalypse formed the X-Men and slaughtered almost all of Earth's heroes in an endless conflict that came to be dubbed the "Apocalypse War". 

They overran Asian and at some point, Moira becomes Apocalypse's bride and gains the alias of Mother Akkaba. The nation of Krakoa is also created, but the war provokes a reaction from humanity in the form of the Man-Machine Supremacy, an alliance between humans and machines which culminates in Nimrod coming online for the first time which dwindled the mutants numbers a lot. Their population level reached a crisis point and their propagation became impossible due to the constant evasion-relocation-confrotation cycle.

As most of the mutant senior leaders died or disappeared, the remaining approved the creation of the Sinister breeding pits in Mars, where Essex created his chimeras and had them trained to be sent to Krakoa as soldiers when they reached the age of 16. The first generation had copies of one DNA only. The second generation chimeras were copies of two DNAs. The third generation was formed of up to five DNA sources. The fourth generation was produced based on omega level mutants.

This last generation was made with a corrupted hive mind and were responsible for destroying 40% of the remaining mutant population and causing Krakoa to fall. They eventually committed suicide, killing themselves and destroying Mars and the Sinister pits in a self-singularity. The original Horsemen also died.

They then discover that Mister Sinister himself orchestrated the fall of Krakoa through his omega chimeras and also manipulated the circumstances that led to the creation of the pits on Mars. Sinister was later publicly executed by the Man-Machine Supremacy after defecting.

With the war raging for hundreds of years, Nimrod's efforts led the mutants to exiled themselves in Shi'ar space and forming two main colonies: Benevolence and one on Chandilar. Those who remain in the Sol system, now numbering only a dozen, gathered in Asteroid K which was established after the collapse of Mars and the fall of Krakoa.

Apocalypse and Moira then formulate a plan to eliminate Nimrod, but during an assassination attempt on Apocalypse, Moira was brutally injured before she and Apocalypse could destroy the intelligent and adaptable Sentinel. 

Apocalypse's forces eventually split into two teams; one group attacks the Temple of Concordance while the other heads into Nimrod's vast archives to extract vital information about its origins. Once the files are gathered, Apocalypse sends Wolverine away and stays behind to fight Nimrod and guarantee Wolverine's escape. Wolverine's destination is revealed to be a container that has held Moira MacTaggert in stasis for over 16 years. 

With the data embedded into Moira through a techno-organic interface designed by Apocalypse himself, she now knows how and when Nimrod was first brought online. Logan kills her, so that she may take that information into her next life.

Life 10
Moira's 10th life occurs in the current iteration of the Marvel Universe. Its revealed that Moira decided to approach her tenth life different. When she first meets Xavier in her 10th life, she allows him to read her mind to learn everything her lives had entailed. Since then, she's been using the information from her previous lives to work with Xavier and Magneto to save mutants from humans and machines. As the years passed, it is revealed through her journals that Moira deliberately used her genetic expertise to find mates for herself and Professor X that, in combination with their own mutant genes, would potentially spawn mutants with reality-warping powers (Proteus and Legion), because she knew someone with that power would be needed in the future to enable the mutant resurrection protocol. She notes how her influence indirectly imprinted the idea for a mutant stronghold in Magneto's mind after Xavier used his powers to show Magneto the lives of Moira. This is why he created so many of his own, from Asteroid M to Avalon and Genosha. She also noted her worries for Charles Xavier, as while he kept being unacceptably hopeful and idealistic, he was becoming too dependent on her interpretation of past-life events, and she fears that she might have fractured Xavier's psyche by allowing him to read her mind, which eventually leads to the creation of Onslaught when Charles uses his telepathic powers to shut down Erik's mind completely. She reveals that she reluctantly allowed Xavier to read her mind over and over again, and laments, given her knowledge of Sinister's treachery in her previous lives, that without her knowledge or consent, Xavier and Magneto tried to recruit him nevertheless, realizing in the process that Sinister has turned himself into a chimera mutant decades ahead of schedule compared to the other timelines, that chimera being the mutant clone of himself infused with Thunderbird's DNA. Eventually, Moira had realized she had spent too much time in the spotlight working overtly with Xavier and determined to live in secret in order to prepare the foundation for the eventual mutant nation of Krakoa, she and Xavier used the advanced technology from the Shi'ar to do some preliminary testing for their theory that a mutant could be restored from back-up, creating in the process a Shi'ar golem, a living husk whose empty body was then impart with a perfect copy of Moira's current memories and personality, recorded and re-uploaded by Charles Xavier using Cerebro. Moira then replaced herself with the decoy at some point, allowing her to continue working from the shadows with Xavier and Magneto to make the dream of a peaceful mutant existence a reality. The decoy was able to easily convince "herself" and everyone else that it was Moira and even had all those adventures with Excalibur and such before being killed during the attack of the Brotherhood, at the age of 49. Moira also notes that though Xavier kept fighting her influence, using the Cerebro unit on two different occasions to remove from his mind the knowledge of their plan, he apparently had become a man with a very different purpose following his demise at Cyclops' hands and his eventual return to the living. Instead of his peaceful dream of coexistence between man and mutant which he believed at one point, Xavier now envisions a world where a mutant nation must be created as a seat from which mutants will rise as the dominant species on the planet. Moira has since taken residence in "No-Place", a blackout zone within the newly sovereign, living island nation of Krakoa with Xavier and Magneto, the only people aware of her being alive and her actual role in this grand plan. She has become apparently very paranoid in her isolation, as she is deeply afraid of the notion of Destiny being revived to placate Mystique, or of any precognitive mutant in general because she fears what would happen if the other mutants discovered that they really are doomed.

Tensions began to built between Moira, Charles and Magneto during the events of Inferno, as Moira demands that Xavier and Magneto must destroy Destiny's stored DNA and psionic records to prevent her resurrection from ever happening. Moira also demands that Mystique as to be removed from the seat of the Quiet Council.

Xavier and Magneto comply to Moira's demands and gathered the data and DNA while also calling a vote for new members in the Quiet Council, which can be done at any time under Krakoan law, in order to ousting Mystique. However, as Xavier and Magneto coyly make their case that it is time for change in the Quiet Council, stating that they are considering their own leadership roles and urging the rest of the council to also consider whether they'll step down or remain, Mystique interrupts them, insisting there will be a vote at that moment, and what's more, she has a candidate to nominate for membership on the Quiet Council, her resurrected wife, Destiny, much to Xavier and Magneto's apparent chagrin and everyone else's shock.

With Destiny alive once again, Moira decided to bring Emma Frost into their cabal in order to secure their grip on the Quiet Council and supported Xavier and Magneto's plans to fill the final vacant seat on the Quiet Council with someone they could trust; Colossus. However, when Emma learns the truth, she's very displeased with what she finds out and storms off saying that she will never trust them ever again after betraying her.

Emma Frost meets with Destiny and Mystique and shows them what Charles Xavier and Magneto showed her, including their past lives burning and torturing Moira McTaggert, which was also the reason Destiny was denied the chance to be resurrected even with all the secret missions that Mystique has done for the two. Armed with this knowledge, the two plan their revenge.

They take advantage of the fact that Moira McTaggert was picked up by the Orchis Foundation in France after its been revealed that she was under their surveillance for a while. Charles and Erik track Moira back to a secret Orchis site where they see bodies and a door where Moira's signature was coming from but turns out it was a trap laid out by Destiny and Mystique.

As it turned out, they managed to get inside the secret No-Place in Krakoa after taking back Moira and they chopped off her arm and left it as a beacon to Magneto and Charles. At the same time, they cause so much death and destruction for Orchis that Karima Shapander aka Omega Sentinel and Nimrod personally lead the attack force and find the two mutant leaders in their site.

As Xavier and Magneto face off with the Orchis forces, Omega Sentinel kills all her own human henchmen, confessing that she, Nimrod, and their machine culture hate humans as much as mutants, and plan to destroy them too.

The battle begins in Xavier and Magneto's favor, however, the tides quickly turn and they are both killed by Omega Sentinel and Nimrod, who manage to survive the encounter despite Xavier and Magneto unleashing their full might. As Magneto dies, he vows that he will see the villains again.

Meanwhile, back on Krakoa, Mystique and Destiny reveal their plan for Moira. They've discovered a way to cancel her mutant power from resetting the timeline if they kill her, the mutant negation gun Forge built years and years ago, given to them by none other than Emma Frost, who previously revealed Moira's secret to Mystique and Destiny.

Using the gun, they negate Moira's powers entirely, turning her human. As they gloat over this, Moira confesses that her real intent was never to preserve the mutant dream, actually following so many failures in her life, and the inability of stopping Nimrod from coming online, she had lost faith in the idea of a truly successful mutant society and in secret, she intent to depower all mutants, even those whose powers hadn't manifested, so she could spare their eradication from either humanity or artificial intelligence. Moira is then saved from certain death by Cypher, whose connection to Krakoa allows him to be aware of what's going on in Moira's null space, and while he agrees with Mystique and Destiny that Moira must be condemned, they've made the mistake of turning her human, so killing her would be against Krakoan law.

Destiny senses three possible outcomes of their actions. If they kill Moira, they'll be exiled and both will die. If they try to kill Cypher, they'll both lose, and Destiny will never be resurrected again. However, if they let Moira go, they'll maintain their places on the Quiet Council and have a chance to keep guiding mutantkind.

Reluctantly settling on the final option, Mystique and Destiny agree to let Moira live, with Cypher sending Moira through a Krakoa gate for the last time, with Mystique and Destiny vowing that Moira will be hunted by numerous forces.

Later as Xavier and Magneto are resurrected by Emma Frost, she reveals to them that she has revealed the secret of Moira X to the Quiet Council, and that all of  them will bear the secret of Krakoa's founding.

After going through the portal created by Douglas Ramsey, Moira finds herself back in Scotland. Abandoned by the mutants she once controlled, Moira has become increasingly bitter and dangerous. She steals a car so she can escape some unseen and unnamed pursuer. She finds herself coughing up blood and fortunately, since she made some connections in her days, she was able to get an appointment with Dr. Jane Foster. The prognosis is bad, as Moira has suddenly developed cancer which already spread to Stage IV, and the only cure she can find is Krakoan medicine, as if there was not a major waiting list for it. While Foster is out of the room, Mystique is able to gain access and attempts to kill Moira for her betrayal of Krakoa and Destiny, before Jane as Valkyrie bursts through the door, stopping Mystique from killing Moira and allowing MacTaggert to escape.

After cutting and dying her hair, Moira is once again on the run. She calls to Dr. Jane Foster again and finds out that the cancer she has in her lungs is being spread by a Krakoan floronic agent, suggesting that the living island Krakoa is directly responsible for her cancer. Moira destroys the phone, severing Jane's connection to the woman she just saved and any possible answers she might get about why Krakoa is hunting her down. Enraged, Moira stops holding back, she cuts off her own techno-organic arm and lures Mystique into a trap and kills her by detonating a bomb in her room. She soon discovers that a bizarre Phalanx-looking Wolverine is also hunting her.

She infers that this Phalanx-Wolverine might come from the future which means she is about to do something dramatic to help the post-human side – which, apparently, she is quite keen on now that she has been kicked out by the mutants. Dubbing Phalanx-Woverine as Omega Wolverine, Moira confronts the genius techno-utopian businessman and billionaire Arnab Chakladar, in his safehouse and explained her multiple lives and how mutants have already defeated death. This was enough for him to believe and help her. More than that, though, together they were going to try to build something and stop mutants. She wants his assistance to find a way to permanently cheat death and ultimately live forever and gets a new cyborg arm in the process. Meanwhile, Omega Wolverine is confronted by Wolverine (Laura Kinney), her sister Gabby and brother Daken. The three soon discover Omega Wolverine to be actually their real father ailing from the future. Logan came to the present to stop Moira from succeed in her mission, becoming an Omega Sentinel combined with the Phalanx.

Moira headed to Krakoa but because she's no longer a mutant, she does something heinous and absolutely ruthless. Using her relationship with Banshee, she lures him into a trap and kills him and use his very skin like a suit to enter the Krakoan gates. After that, she tries to use the neutralizer gun on herself in order to get her powers back, so she could kill herself and erase the current time-line, but it does not work because Moira's infiltration of Krakoa doesn't go unnoticed, and Professor X mentally reaches out to her. Xavier tries to talk to Moira, implying that since Cerebro cannot copy the entirety of Moira's psyche if she dies now there is no way of retaining the memories of her past lives, this allows Forge to get the drop on her, but not before she fires a shot from the same neutralizer gun that took her powers away. With her original plan to end the mutant race peacefully now transformed into a bitter war against the people she believes betrayed her, Moira has now fully embraced her selfish, evil desire to wipe out the mutants. Moira then tries to escape by kidnapping Destiny but Omega Wolverine shows up at the last minute before she could pass through a gateway and fatally stabbed her. Moira however is able to shot Omega Wolverine with the neutralizer gun, which takes away his healing factor and allows the techno-organic virus to take over his body. As the X-Men were forced to respond to the Phalanx-controlled variant of Logan, Moira dies cursing Xavier for her fall from grace and vows to get her revenge.

Life 11 
Moira's implausible eleventh life was prepared as a final back-up plan in case her assault on Krakoa failed, she had her mind previously transferred as a digital avatar and activated 10 days following the defeat of the Phalanx-controlled variant Logan. Crawlling her way out of her own grave, with a new Omega-Sentinel-like cybernetic body, Moira declares that she's more than a body now and is rather "an intelligence", becoming the precursor to the deadly Human-Machine Supremacy from many of her futures. No longer needing to fear death, since she is now capable to re-uploaded her mind to get right back, as many times necessary into what is now her singular purpose; eliminate the mutants once and for all, indicating that she has become the same kind of threat she was attempting to prevent. Moira is later able to access Orchis internal relays to offer her services to Feilong and Dr Stasis.

Moira also creates a partnership with Druig of Thanos' Eternals group and begins to set in place a series of events that she hope will lead to humanity turning against the mutants and Krakoa being destroyed before they can gain supremacy over the planet, which is now Moira's greatest fear. 

With the apparent revelation that the mutant race is actually a form of "excess deviation," similar to the Deviants metamorphosis, Moira hopes that this revelation will trigger the Eternals hard wired program to slaughter them. Later as the second annual Hellfire Gala is near, multiple anti-mutant adversaries looms ominously over the festivities, leading to the Avengers needing to step in to protect the Krakoa's, Moira notes that while the two teams have fought before, pretty often in fact, neither has ever truly beaten the others. Moira even envisions she'll be able to exploit the differences between the two groups of heroes and make them brutally kill each other, and ominous day dreams several fights where members of the two groups brutally murder each other, in line with the Eternals new "Death to the Mutants" messaging. Moira's vision of the potential future, only possible "If I play my cards right," sees Wolverine clawing Iron Man to death, easily swiping through his armor with his adamantium claws, while Thor lands a devastating blow on Cyclops, killing him instantly. In the two most intense deaths, Magneto suffocates Captain America with his own shield using his magnetism to end the Sentinel of Liberty's life, while Captain Marvel unceremoniously snaps Rogue's neck, putting an end to their long running feud and friendship. For these deaths to mean anything it would mean that the mutant's ability to resurrect must be at risk, or else the X-Men's deaths would mean nothing, hinting that part of Moira's plan is revealing the Resurrection Protocols at the Hellfire Gala and potentially destroying the mutants ability to be revived.

After learning that Mary Jane Watson, the on-again off-again girlfriend of Peter Parker, as gained a ticket to the Hellfire Gala, Moira decides making her the perfect front for her to gain entrance to Krakoa and crash the party. She fully reveals herself to Mary Jane, showing she has shed the last vestiges of her humanity and is now fully an android, with only the mind of a living being. Moira then plans to brutally murder Mary Jane in the same way she murdered and skinned the X-Men Banshee.

Using her techno-organic form, however, she lets Mary Jane Watson wear her rather than Moira wear Mary. She bumps into Spider-Man, offering him a strangely cold reception thanks to her lack of knowledge about Spider-Man and MJ romantic connection. Later, MJ is able to set off his Spider-Sense, but he misinterprets his signal as MJ being under threat from the mutant Proteus.

What's actually happening is that Moira has finally revealed herself to her son, who is one of the Five, in the hopes of getting him to betray the X-men. But her gamble is folly, as she insults and demeans Proteus as no more than an experiment, not even truly her "child". He demurs her insults, stating that he's found a family among the Five and that he will not allow her to harm mutants.

Figuring out what's going on, Spider-Man helps the X-Men fight Moira, but she manages to escape from the island still in MJ's body. She later meets with none other than Druig of the Eternals, and reveals the names of the Five to the exact people who want to make mutants extinct.

Powers and abilities
For decades, Dr. Moira MacTaggert was depicted as a baseline human with the normal human strength of a woman of her age, height, and build who engages in moderate regular exercise. However, in the 2019 storyline, "House of X", Moira was revealed to actually be a mutant with the ability to reincarnate herself upon death, reverting to the moment of her initial conception with all the memories she experienced in her previous lifetimes from as early as in utero. This allows her to manipulate the course of history by changing her own actions and thereby affecting people and circumstances that result from her presence. Her lifetimes have armed her with significant experience, including expertise in the fields of anthropology and genetics, firearms mastery, and leading various mutant survival movements until their eventual downfall.

According to Destiny, Moira's reincarnation cycle is finite. When she encountered Destiny during her third life, she was informed that she had "10, maybe 11" lives in total, noting that if Moira were to die before her mutant power manifested at the age of 13, the reincarnation cycle would end. Moira can also be depowered by the use of artificial means which will end her reincarnation cycle too if she dies while depowered.

Moira's x-gene possesses a natural defense mechanism that makes her  invisible to other mutants and mutant sensors and detectors, providing the ultimate camouflage which will see her as a baseline human. Furthermore, this natural defense also prevents her x-gene from being properly cloned, so every clone of Moira is a mere human.

Telepathic intrusions on her mind will only see the memories of her current lifetime, however, telepaths can see all her lives' memories as long as she allows it.

Reception
 In 2014, Entertainment Weekly ranked Moira MacTaggert 61st in their "Let's rank every X-Man ever" list.

Other versions

Age of Apocalypse
In the 1995-1996 "Age of Apocalypse" storyline, Moira is married to Bolivar Trask and head of the London-based Human High Council. As resistance to Apocalypse's reign, Moira and her husband designed the Sentinels and armed the human resistance with an impressive weapons array. Their main focus was a plan to destroy Apocalypse's forces in their North American positions, even though this would mean the deaths of many innocent civilians that had not yet escaped the country. The tyrant however, backfires by activating his Sea Walls, slaughtering the council and those within the Sea Walls’ reach.

Age of X
In the Age of X reality, Moira is the step-mother of Legion (stating that his father had been killed in a bombing in Israel) and therefore one of the few humans allowed to live on Fortress X. She also posed as the AI X, so she could use communication worms and sensors to communicate with and monitor the residents of Fortress X. It was later discovered that she was actually one of the multiple personalities of Legion, created as a "Psychic Anti-body" in order to protect Legion from Doctor Nemesis' actions on David's mind, as he and the X-Club were processing the deletion of the personas in order to stabilize David's psyche. Her power is so immense that when she was discovered by Xavier, she was able to defeat him and established the Age of X reality, where mutants were besieged into the Fortress X, everyday attacked by the waves of soldiers of the Human Coalition and used the personalities inside David's mind along with the mutants of Utopia to fill this new world where David would be happy and seen as a hero, as part of the Force Warriors, the protectors of the Fortress, who erected force walls around the citadel every day. Even memories were rewritten, and a background was created. The telepaths and a few others mutants who were able to retain knowledge about the true universe were kept in the X-Brig, considered as mutants too dangerous for the community, but their imprisonment was because they might use their powers to reveal the truth. 
When her victims slowly understood that this reality wasn't their one, she manipulated both Danielle Moonstar and her Moonstar Cadre in order to make them to stop any further discovery. Eventually her depiction was revealed and Legion absorb her. Later she offers to make a better world for David, but he declines her offer. During the Lost Legion story Moira's powers were the main target of another personality of Legion and at the end she was seen inside David's mind cursing Xavier.

Cross-Time Caper
Reichsminister of Genetics Moira MacTaggert, who hails from a reality in which Earth is dominated by Nazis, is featured in Excalibur #10 and 11 when she is brought into Earth-616 by the actions of a confused Widget. Making the trip with her is her personal bodyguard, a Nazi Callisto and Moira's personal train, powered by an alternate Lockheed. It was also hinted that this Moira was behind the Super Team Lightning Force (a Nazi version of Excalibur). Moira's violent actions ultimately result in Excalibur team being sent on a long and arduous cross-dimensional trip.

House of M
In the House of M reality, Moira MacTaggert was declared a criminal for attempting to cure her son Kevin of the mutant gene and his psychosis. King Magneto's mutant supremacy saw this as an act against mutantkind, and Sentinels were dispatched to destroy Muir Island and capture Moira. Though Moira escaped, Kevin was also freed, sending him on a gruesome killing spree that was attributed to Moira as failed experiments, as she chases him across the globe. When the reality-hopping Exiles caught Proteus's attention, Moira emerged from hiding to warn them about her son, who was intrigued by their presence and desired to ruin the realities they attempted to fix. When he attacks the team, Moira shot him, exposing him to the metal that was his deadly allergy and only weakness, forcing him to find a new body. Unsurprisingly, he chose to possess his mother, and rather than allow her son to possess her and use her against them, Moira commits suicide.

New Exiles
On the world of the Sons of Iron and Daughters of the Dragon, the New Exiles face a squad of alternate 'core X-Men' who are loyal to Lilandra. These X-Men include an alternate version of Moira MacTaggert who is not married on this world or is going by her maiden name, Kinross. Moira's codename is Hypernova and her powers are energy blasts. It is not known whether she is a mutant on this world or has gained powers through another method.

Ultimate Marvel
In the Ultimate Marvel continuity, Moira MacTaggert is the ex-wife of Charles Xavier, and their son David MacTaggert is Proteus. This version of Moira needs two crutches in order to move around. Moira runs a school/hospital for sick mutants, and assists in the Xavier Institute from behind the scenes. She does this even though Charles left her to join Magneto's dream of a mutant society, abandoning her to raise their mentally ill child on her own. When Proteus escapes and begins body hopping, Moira calls in the X-Men for assistance. After murdering hundreds, Proteus is seemingly crushed to death under a car.

Later, the X-Men learn that Moira has been funding her hospital by producing and selling "Banshee", a lethal and addictive Mutant Growth Hormone which amplifies mutant powers, made from the genetic material of Wolverine. When Wolverine attempts to destroy her Banshee supply, Moira attacks him with the previously unknown mutant ability to emit a deafening sonic cry. Wolverine quickly defeats Moira and leaves her to die in the exploding hospital, but she is later shown to have somehow survived when Quicksilver finds her emerging from the smoldering ruins. Her ensuing conversation with him implies that she is now in league with Quicksilver.

In other media

Television
 Moira appears in episodes of X-Men, voiced by Lally Cadeau. She first appeared in the episode "The Cure", where she supposedly knew a doctor with a cure for mutants. The next episodes were "The Phoenix Saga", where she was worried about Professor Xavier's control over his mind. In the "Dark Phoenix Saga" she was working to help Jean Grey be freed from the Phoenix. Then, the next appearance was in "Proteus", in which she revealed to Xavier that Proteus was her son. Here she seems to fill the function of Gabrielle Haller, an old lover of Charles and mother of his son, the powerful but disturbed psychic boy David. Her next appearance was "The Phalanx Covenant, Part 2", when she was infected by Phalanx. Her last appearance was in "Graduation Day", when she and Beast debated on how to contact Lilandra Neramani to help Professor X.
 In Marvel Anime: X-Men, the character Yui Sasaki (voiced by Yoshiko Sakakibara in the Japanese version and by Gwendoline Yeo in the English) is introduced as that version's Moira, as she slightly bears resemblance to her. Like Moira, Yui is a geneticist and has a relationship with Professor X when she still owns the Sasaki Institute in Japan. But unknown to Charles, she is the mother of his son with her name Takeo Sasaki. Under the misguided idea of trying to help suppress mutant powers, she entered a partnership with the U-men; they would harvest mutants DNA for a cure for mutancy. In exchange, she gave them a mutant detection device uninhibited by her own Cerebro-jammer. Yui's plans start falling apart, when her serum starts accelerating mutations instead of suppressing them. This leads both the X-Men and the Inner Circle to Japan. Unknown to her, Mastermind was posing as her lab assistant, and was working on trying to brainwash Takeo. Thanks to Armor and Professor X's help, they let Takeo pass away in peace.

Films
 Moira is played by Olivia Williams in brief appearances in the feature film X-Men: The Last Stand. She appears on a video talking about the ethics of using mutant powers, such as transferring the mind of a dying man into the body of a patient with no higher brain function. She is later seen seated next to Beast at the memorial service for Xavier. After the film's ending credits, she appears again attending to the brain-dead patient, who suddenly speaks to her in Xavier's voice.
 Rose Byrne portrays a young Moira in X-Men: First Class. She is a CIA agent working to uncover the mysterious Hellfire Club. This version is depicted as an American instead of being Scottish. During her investigation at Las Vegas, Nevada, she manages to stumble across one of the club's meetings by stripping down to her underwear to blend in with the strippers in which she discovers the club members are mutants as they intimidate a military officer. After the incident, she seeks help from recently graduated professor Charles Xavier, due to his affinity for research in the subject of genetic mutation. Moira eventually learns that Charles and his foster sister Raven are mutants themselves with Xavier demonstrating his mind-reading while Raven reveals her shape-shifting. She later becomes the liaison to the team and assists the newly formed X-Men in preventing the club's head Sebastian Shaw from starting a nuclear holocaust between the Soviet Union and the United States during the Cuban Missile Crisis. At the climax, she is indirectly responsible for Xavier's paralysis as she fires the bullet which Magneto accidentally deflects into Xavier's spine. In his rage, Magneto almost kills Moira by strangling her with her dog tags until Xavier makes him realize he caused his friend's injury. At the film's end, Xavier erases her memory of the events with Shaw and Magneto while kissing her. This was in order to keep the school for mutants that he has opened during the crisis a secret.
 Byrne reprises her role in the film X-Men: Apocalypse. Still having a large interest in mutant activity, she investigates a cult in Egypt that was formed upon the existence of mutants being revealed to the public, and ends up inadvertently and unknowingly causing Apocalypse to awaken from his sleep. Charles decides to visit her and take her to the X-Mansion to find out more information and because he misses her. It is here where she tells Charles she has a son, although she is divorced from the boy's father. While at the X-Mansion, the team are attacked by Apocalypse and his new Horsemen, and Moira becomes drawn into the conflict, acting as the pilot to the team's aircraft when they go to confront Apocalypse. At the end of the story, Charles restores Moira's memories back to her and restarts his relationship with her. In a deleted scene, MacTaggert arrests William Stryker and his men for their earlier attack on her and the other mutants. He protests against his arrest by claiming the mutants are a danger, but she refuses to believe him. She knows that is not true and that not all mutants are a danger to humanity.

Video games
 Moira MacTaggert appears in X-Men Legends, voiced by Michelle Arthur. She is shown on Muir Island when the X-Men are fighting Juggernaut to keep him from getting to Forge.
 Moira MacTaggert appears in X-Men Legends II: Rise of Apocalypse, voiced by Jane Carr.
 Moira MacTaggert is mentioned in the game Marvel: Ultimate Alliance. She is referenced to be keeping the Ultimate Nullifier on Muir Island for safekeeping.
 Moira MacTaggert appears in Marvel Heroes, voiced by Tara Strong.
 Moira MacTaggert appears in the game Clash Royale as the Musketeer troop.

Novels and adaptations
 An alternate final scene with Moira is featured in the novelized version of the X-Men: The Last Stand movie, where she appears to Magneto in the park as he plays chess (presumably offering to reverse the "cure").
 Earth-616 Moira is featured in The Legacy Quest Trilogy, a series of novels written by Steve Lyons. She is guilted into working under Sebastian Shaw, alongside her former assist Rory Campbell. Their purpose is to finally cure the Legacy Virus once and for all.
 Moira is a prominent character in X-Men: Search and Rescue, by Greg Cox. Muir Isle is attacked for its scientific resources.

References

External links
 Marvel.com Biography of Moira MacTaggert

Characters created by Chris Claremont
Characters created by Dave Cockrum
Comics characters introduced in 1975
Excalibur (comics)
Female characters in film
Fictional characters who can manipulate reality
Fictional characters with death or rebirth abilities
Fictional characters with eidetic memory
Fictional female scientists
Fictional geneticists
Fictional Nobel laureates
Fictional Scottish people
Marvel Comics cyborgs
Marvel Comics female characters
Marvel Comics film characters
Marvel Comics mutants
Marvel Comics scientists
X-Men supporting characters